The Woman with Dropsy or The Dropsical Woman is an oil on canvas painting by Dutch artist Gerrit Dou, created c. 1663. It shows a woman suffering from edema and is considered as one of Dou's masterpieces. 

Previously in Charles Emmanuel IV's collections, he gave it to Bertrand Clauzel in December 1798. Then adjutant-general to revolutionary France's Armée d'Italie, Clauzel offered it to the French Directory, which in 1799 added it to the Republic's central art museum (later to become the Louvre Museum), making it the first painting to be donated to that collection and placing Clauzel at the top of the plaque of donors on the "rotonde d'Apollon". It is still in the Louvre as INV. 1213.

References

Medicine in art
1660s paintings
Paintings by Gerrit Dou
Paintings in the Louvre by Dutch, Flemish and German artists
Genre paintings